Stanhopea candida is a species of orchid endemic to southern tropical America (Bolivia, Brazil, Colombia, Ecuador, Peru and Venezuela).

References

External links 

candida
Orchids of Bolivia
Orchids of Brazil
Orchids of Colombia
Orchids of Ecuador
Orchids of Peru
Orchids of Venezuela